The Bornean forktail (Enicurus borneensis) is a species of bird in the family Muscicapidae. It is found on Borneo.

References

 Gill F, D Donsker & P Rasmussen  (Eds). 2022. IOC World Bird List (v12.2). doi :  10.14344/IOC.ML.12.2

Enicurus
Birds of Brunei
Birds of Indonesia
Birds of Malaysia
Birds described in 1889